Brihony June Dawson (born 1984) is an Australian television presenter, sports commentator and singer. In 2022, they were billed as the first non-binary presenter to front a major TV show in Australia, as well as the first non-binary host of The Challenge reality TV franchise.

Early life
Dawson studied at Karingal Park Secondary College, graduating in 2001, and the Ballarat Academy of Performing Arts, graduating with a Bachelor of Theatre Production in 2004.

Career
Dawson has toured extensively as a vocalist, including between 2011 and 2015 in the band Last Mistress, alongside fellow members Gabriel Atkinson on lead guitar, Ken Hennessy on bass guitar, Anthony Troiano on drums and Dean Williams on rhythm guitar. Since 2016, Dawson has been with the band LadyHood as a singer. They have played with acts such as Aerosmith, Guns N' Roses and Daryl Braithwaite.

Dawson was the host of the AFL Grand Final Preview Show on Channel 31 in 2020 and the on-ground host of the 2021 AFL Women's Grand Final. They also hosted Women's Footy on the Nine Network in 2022 and was the boundary rider for Fox Footy at women's AFL games. In November 2022, it was announced they would be co-hosting the 2022 W Awards alongside Sarah Jones.

Aside from covering the AFLW Grand Final, Dawson has also worked as a host of the Australian Grand Prix, the Sydney Gay and Lesbian Mardi Gras and The Women's Footy Show. In 2023, they was announced as the on-the-ground host for the ABC coverage of the Sydney WorldPride Opening Concert, which aired on 24 February 2023. Dawson was offered a role on The Challenge after a TV executive saw them hosting a sports function at the Melbourne Cricket Ground.

In August 2022, Dawson was announced as the host of Network 10's The Challenge: Australia, a local spin-off adaption of the long-running American reality show The Challenge, which was first broadcast in November 2022. They were widely reported as being the first non-binary presenter fronting a major Australian television series, as well as the first non-binary, non-male host of The Challenge TV franchise. Dawson has described The Challenge as "like Survivor meets Big Brother meets Ninja Warrior". After trying out various approaches as host, they decided with producer Stephen Tate against imitating the "ominous" style of U.S. host T. J. Lavin, and to "do the Brihony version" instead.

Dawson will also co-host The Challenge: World Championship on Paramount+, alongside host T.J. Lavin and the hosts of the show's other international spin-offs: Mark Wright, from the United Kingdom, and Marley, from Argentina.

Personal life
Dawson has been married to Shae Dawson since March 2020.

Notes

References

External links

1984 births
Living people
Australian non-binary people
Australian television presenters
Australian singer-songwriters
Australian sports commentators
Australian LGBT singers
Singers from Victoria (Australia)